Giacomo Gaetani Stefaneschi (c. 1270 – 23 June 1343) was an Italian cardinal deacon.

Life
Born in Rome, he was the son of the senator Pietro Stefaneschi and his wife, Perna Orsini. He received his early education at Rome, and was sent to the University of Paris to pursue higher studies. After three years he received the degree of Master of Arts, and intended to devote himself to the study of philosophy and Holy Scripture, having already begun to teach at the university, when his parents recalled him to Italy in order that he should study canon and civil law.

He was highly esteemed by Pope Celestine V, who made him canon of St. Peter's and auditor of the Rota. He was created cardinal-deacon of the titular Church of San Giorgio in Velabro on 17 December 1295 by Pope Boniface VIII, who also sent him as legate to Cesena, Forlì, Faenza and Bologna in 1296 to suppress civil disturbances. Pope John XXII appointed him protector of the Minorites, 23 July 1334. He was never ordained priest.

He died at Avignon.

Works
Stefaneschi is best known as the author of Opus Metricum, a life of Celestine V composed in dactylic hexameter. Abstracting from a short autobiography left in his cell by Celestine when he became pope, the Opus Metricum is the earliest biography of the hermit-pontiff. It is composed of three parts, each complete in itself and written at a different time. In 1319 the author united these three separate poems into one work and sent it with a dedicatory epistle to the prior and the monks of San Spirito at Sulmona, the mother-house of the Celestines. The first part contains in three books an account of the election, reign, and abdication of Celestine. It was written before Stefaneschi became cardinal. The second part describes in two books the election and coronation of Boniface VIII, and was written five years later, when Stefaneschi was already cardinal. The third part is composed of three books and describes the life of Celestine after he had abdicated, his canonization, and miracles. The poem is preceded by an introduction in prose, which contains valuable data of the author's life and a synopsis of the whole work. Though of great historical value, the poem is devoid of all literary excellence, and at times is even extremely clumsy and barbarous. It was first edited by Papebroch, Acta Sanctorum, IV, May, 436-483.

The other works of Stefaneschi are: Liber de Centesimo sive Jubileo, edited by Quattrocchi in "Bessarione" (1900), an interesting and historically important account of the first Roman Jubilee, held in 1300; Liber ceremoniarum Curiæ Romanæ, a book of ceremonies to be observed at the Roman Court; Vita S. Georgii Martyris, a eulogy on St. George, the patron of Stefaneschi's titular church; and "Historia de miraculo Mariæ facto Avinione", a short narrative of how a young man, who had been condemned to death at Avignon, was miraculously delivered by the Virgin Mary.

References

1270 births
1343 deaths
Writers from Rome
14th-century Italian cardinals
Italian male writers